The 2021 Indian film Master was subjected to several controversial issues, firstly being the disruption of film shooting due to an income tax raid in lead actor Vijay's residence and protests by Bharatiya Janata Party. The film which had a delayed release of 13 January 2021 due to COVID-19 lockdown, was initially planned to be released in 100% seating capacity in theatres with forthcoming other Tamil films by the Government of Tamil Nadu, following Vijay's personal request to the then chief minister Edappadi K. Palaniswami. After backlash from doctors and social activists, followed by the Central Government's decision against full occupancy in theatres, this move was revoked immediately and eventually released in 50% seating occupancy. Later, few scenes from the film were pirated by anonymous peoples before the theatrical release. Soon after its theatrical run, the film was made available on the streaming portal Amazon Prime Video, 16 days after theatrical release (29 January 2021), leading to criticism from theatre owners and exhibitors.

Income tax raid 
On 5 February 2020, the Income Tax Department raided Vijay's residence in Chennai and inquired about potential tax evasion, regarding his investment in immovable properties which he inherited from the production studio AGS Entertainment, which bankrolled Bigil (2019). Vijay was investigated when he was shooting for Master in Neyveli, which disrupted the film's shoot. Nearly 77 crore was seized by the officials from properties belonging to AGS Entertainment, the creative producer of Bigil, Archana Kalpathi and film financer Anbu Cheliyan's residence. In March 2020, another raid took place on the film's co-producer and distributor, Lalit Kumar's residence and also the office of his production house, 7 Screen Studios, due to the film's pre-release business as Kumar had got a share of 50 crore profit from 220 crore. On 13 March 2020, the IT department said that nothing significant was found during the raid and Vijay has paid all taxes. The Income Tax further released figures from a tax evasion probe showing that Vijay received ₹50 crore for Bigil and ₹80 crore from Master. Member of parliament Dayanidhi Maran accused the ruling Bharatiya Janata Party (BJP) of politically targeting Vijay through IT raids because he was critical of the BJP.

Protests by Bharatiya Janata Party 
On 7 February 2020, members of the Bharatiya Janata Party (BJP) protested in front of the Neyveli Lignite Corporation (NLC) where the film's final shooting schedule being held. The party members protested against the NLC administration for granting permission for the shoot. Though the film crew had obtained permission for the shoot, the members of the BJP claimed that it is a highly secured area and it's not a place for a movie shoot and also threatened to continue their protests if the shooting did not stop. Soon, Vijay's fans came in support of the actor and protested against the party workers. The protesters and the fans left after intervention by the police.

Theatre seating capacity in Tamil Nadu 
The makers were given permission to release the film with 100% seating capacity in theatres with forthcoming other Tamil films by the Government of Tamil Nadu after Vijay personally requested chief minister Edappadi K. Palaniswami, despite the increase in COVID-19 cases in India, especially Tamil Nadu. Shortly thereafter, the Central Government of India issued a warrant against the Tamil Nadu government's decision to approve the release of the films with 100% seating capacity. The Central Government stated that 100% seating occupancy is clearly in violation of the guidelines of the Minister of Home Affairs which only allows 50% seat occupancy in theatres. Many doctors and social activists also protested against the film having 100% seating capacity. Soon after, Central Government notice was passed and it was revoked back to 50% seating capacity in Tamil Nadu theatres.

Prior to the issues regarding occupancy, Vijay was insisted by the exhibitors to reduce his salary of the film, so that the budget of the film can be cut down and also become profitable to the distributors. Eventually, the distributors also planned Master for a solo theatrical release in Tamil Nadu, to ensure maximum collections. The Tamil Nadu Theatre Owners Association head Tiruppur Subramanian claimed that the film may be prioritised by the theatres if being screened in 50% occupancy. Post the film's theatrical release, more than 10 theatres in Chennai were booked for violating COVID-19 safety precautions by allowing 100% seating occupancy in theatres.

Online piracy 
On 12 January 2021, a day before the theatrical release, some of the film scenes were reportedly leaked by few anonymous people in social media which triggered controversies in the film fraternity. Lokesh Kanagaraj and Malavika Mohanan openly urged the audience not to share the film leaked scenes with others and firmly requested them to watch the film in theatres maintaining relevant safety precautions. Many directors, producers and actors from South Indian film fraternity supported Kanagaraj regarding this issue. Twitter later assisted the production team of the film to find who leaked the film scenes in the internet and it was revealed that a person who worked for a digital company for which the film copy was sold for distribution rights abroad had allegedly stolen the copy of the film and leaked them in the internet.

Digital streaming release 
Master became the fastest Tamil film to be streamed on a digital platform, a first-of-a-kind for an Indian film, where the makers teamed up with Amazon Prime Video to premiere the film on 29 January 2021, 16 days after the theatrical release. While Xavier Britto claimed that the film was not released in primary overseas centres which was considered to be the reason for an early digital release, the theatre owners raised objection to this, opining that piracy sites will upload the high definition print of the film and this may cause a dent in the film's collections. However, the team proceeded with the plans of release, despite theatre owners request to delay the digital premiere; the theatre owners demanded 10% share for the screening in theatres. After the film's early digital release, theatre owners later announced that no film should premiere in a digital platform less than 30 days of its theatrical release. Despite the early digital premiere, theatre owners continued to screen the film following the demand of fans, and also due to lack of footfalls being generated from the films released post Master, citing poor content and dullness in promotional activities.

Other issues 
The film's shooting was held in a school for visually challenged-children at Poonamallee for three days, but that drew mixed reactions regarding the behaviour of the crew members in that location. Saravana Pandian, the school co-ordinator was upset about Vijay, as he was reported to meet and interact the visually challenged students and he did not do so. Eventually, he also criticised few of the crew members for smoking in the school premises irrespective of the student's existence. The Chief Metropolitan Magistrate, Egmore directed the CB-CID to file an FIR against the producer Xavier Britto pertaining to copyright infringement. The Court order comes as a result of the case filed by Novex Communications Private Limited, a music copyright company. According to the petitioner, few songs of the film were played at the film's audio launch which took place on 15 March 2020 without acquiring any copyrights from Think Music, one of the clients of the company. Another petition was filed by K. Rangadas, citing allegations of plagiarism and said that the film's storyline is based on one of his works in the film which he had registered for the South Indian Film Writers Association in 2017.

Notes

References 

2020 in Indian cinema
2021 in Indian cinema
Film controversies in India